Ingrid Gamarra Martins (born 22 August 1996) is a Brazilian professional tennis player. She has career-high WTA rankings of 448 in singles, achieved on 31 January 2022, and 91 in doubles, attained on 16 January 2023.

Gamarra Martins made her main-draw debut on the WTA Tour at the 2015 Rio Open, in the doubles event, partnering Carolina Alves.

Gamarra Martins also attended the University of South Carolina, graduating in 2019, majoring in integrated information technology. As part of the Gamecocks, she won the 2019 Southeastern Conference tournament, with MVP and Player of the Year honors, ending her college tennis career ranked fourth in the Intercollegiate Tennis Association rankings.

She first entered the world top 100 doubles in December 2022.

WTA Challenger finals

Doubles: 1 (title)

ITF Circuit finals

Singles: 7 (4 titles, 3 runner–ups)

Doubles: 20 (10 titles, 10 runner–ups)

References

External links
 
 

1996 births
Living people
Brazilian female tennis players
Sportspeople from Rio de Janeiro (city)
South Carolina Gamecocks women's tennis players
20th-century Brazilian women
21st-century Brazilian women